The Sumathi Most Popular Teledrama Series Award is presented annually in Sri Lanka by the Sumathi Group of Campany associated with many commercial brands for the popular Sri Lankan teledrama series of the year in television screen.

The award was first given in 1995. Following is a list of the winners of this prestigious title since then.

References

Popular Teledrama